Karl Hagedorn may refer to:

 Karl Hagedorn (1889-1969), German painter, naturalised British
 Karl Hagedorn (1922–2005), German-American painter